Muhd Nazri bin Ahmad (born 17 March 1990) is a Malaysian footballer.

Club career

Kelantan
On 13 December 2013, it was announced that his contract with Kelantan was legit and may play for Kelantan in 2014. The controversy occurred after he signed a contract with two clubs. Nazri prior signed with Selangor but later decided to play with Kelantan.

Melaka United
On 14 January 2017, Nazri has been announced as one of the Melaka United players for 2017 season.

Statistics

Club

References

External links
 

1990 births
Living people
Malaysian footballers
Kelantan FA players
Malaysian people of Malay descent
Sabah F.C. (Malaysia) players
Melaka United F.C. players
Association football fullbacks